The Only Snow in Havana is a non-fiction book, written by Canadian writer Elizabeth Hay, first published in September 1992 by Cormorant Books. In the book, the author chronicles an eight-year sojourn in which she traveled to Mexico, and through Cuba and Latin America, settling in New York until her return to Ottawa in 1992. Hay was homesick throughout her time away, and every new experience of her travels invoked reflections of home, which she recorded in her journal. Hay's journals resulted in a trilogy of books, of which, The Only Snow in Havana is second.

Awards and honours
The Only Snow in Havana received the 1993 "Edna Staebler Award for Creative Non-Fiction".

See also
List of Edna Staebler Award recipients

References

External links
Elizabeth Hay, Home page, Retrieved 11/20/2012

Canadian travel books
1992 non-fiction books
Cormorant Books books